Tiszasas is a village in Jász-Nagykun-Szolnok county, in the Northern Great Plain region of central Hungary. It is near the river Tisza, where people like to go fishing. It has a church near the river. Trains go from Budapest to Tiszasas or from Budapest to Szolnok and from there to Tiszasas. It takes 1 hour and 50 minutes via car from Budapest to Tiszasas.

Geography

References

External links
 Official site in Hungarian

Tiszasas